Fiacre Blane Kelleher (born 10 March 1996) is an Irish professional footballer who plays for Colchester United as a defender.

Early and personal life
Born in Cork, Kelleher is from Blackrock. He has three older brothers who played hurling, as did he. He is the older brother of Liverpool goalkeeper Caoimhín Kelleher.

Club career

Early career
Kelleher began his career with local Cork club Avondale, before signing for Scottish club Celtic in 2012. He moved on loan to Peterhead in July 2016.

He signed for English club Oxford United in June 2017. He moved on loan to Solihull Moors in August 2017, extending the deal in January 2018 until the end of the season.

Macclesfield Town
He joined Macclesfield Town on loan in June 2018.  Kelleher made his professional debut on the first day of the 2018–19 season, starting the game against Swindon Town. He scored his first goal for club in an EFL Cup draw with Bradford City in August, and his first league goal in a 3–3 draw with Newport County at the beginning of October. After being released by Oxford at the end of the season, he returned to Macclesfield and was named captain of the side for the 2019–20 season.

Wrexham
On 12 September 2020, Kelleher signed for National League side Wrexham.

Kelleher was released by Wrexham on 2 June 2021.

Bradford City
On 29 June 2021 it was announced that he had signed a two-year contract with Bradford City. He later said that he was "excited" to train with his new teammates. He entered the starting line-up after an injury to captain Niall Canavan, later saying that the club's dip in form was not enjoyable.

In April 2022 he said was "gobsmacked" that the club had hired Mark Hughes as manager.

He moved on loan to Solihull Moors in July 2022, for the entire season. He was recalled by Bradford City in January 2023, with a view to making a permanent transfer elsewhere.

Colchester United
The next day, he signed for Colchester United for an undisclosed fee. He had said that his time at Bradford had "not worked out", having made 11 appearances for the club. After signing for Colchester he became "in the heart of the defence".

International career
Kelleher has represented Ireland at under-19 level.

Career statistics

References

1996 births
Living people
Association football defenders
Association footballers from County Cork
Cork hurlers
Celtic F.C. players
Peterhead F.C. players
Oxford United F.C. players
Solihull Moors F.C. players
Macclesfield Town F.C. players
Wrexham A.F.C. players
Bradford City A.F.C. players
Colchester United F.C. players
English Football League players
Republic of Ireland association footballers
National League (English football) players